Beacon English School (also known as Beacon English Medium Higher Secondary School) is a Co-educational school situated in Gevra Project, Korba, Chhattisgarh. It was founded on 5 September 1993 by the Menno Christian Education Society and with the help of South Eastern Coalfields Limited.

History
School was founded by Menno Christen Education Society (MCES) to provide proper education to deserving children without the distinction of caste, creed and color. Proper stress is given for discipline and character. Formation and also for all-round development of the personality of the child in accordance with the teaching of the Holy Bible and in the love of Jesus Christ.

See also
Education in India
Literacy in India                                         
 DAV Public School, Gevra
 Rajkumar College, Raipur

References

External links
 Beacon English School – Official Website

Christian schools in India
Central Board of Secondary Education
Private schools in Chhattisgarh
High schools and secondary schools in Chhattisgarh
Korba district
Educational institutions established in 1993
1993 establishments in Madhya Pradesh